The number of national daily newspapers in Norway was 96 in 1950, whereas it was 83 in 1965. A total of 191 newspapers was published in 1969. There were 221 newspapers in the country in 1996. The number of the newspaper was 233 in the country in 1999. The Institute for Information and Media Science at the University of Bergen listed 296 newspapers in 2003. There were 297 titles in 2012.

Categories
Norwegian newspapers fall into several categories:
 National newspapers, i.e., those that target readers in all regions.
 Political party newspapers, i.e., those that function more or less as a party or political movement's mouthpiece.
 Regional newspapers, i.e., those that target readers in a geographic area.
 Tabloid and broadsheet papers.

Newspapers
Following is a sample of newspapers published in Norway.

Online editions
The Institute for Journalism provides a directory of online newspapers.

All Daily Newspapers .
All Daily Newspapers, Online Newsportal, Magazine and Others .

References

 
Norway
Newspapers